Ibrahima Ba or Ibrahim Ba may refer to:

 Ibrahim Ba (athlete) (born 1953), Senegalese long jumper, represented Senegal at the 1976 Summer Olympics
 Ibrahima Ba (footballer) (born 1984), Senegalese international football player

See also 

 Ba (surname)
 Ibrahim Ba (born 1973), French footballer, known as "Ibou"
 Ibrahim Bah (born 1970), Sierra Leonean footballer